Diana – also known as Diana of the Tower – is an iconic statue by sculptor Augustus Saint-Gaudens, representing the goddess Diana. Once a major artistic feature of New York City, the second version stood atop the tower of Madison Square Garden from 1893 to 1925. Since 1932, it has been in the collection of the Philadelphia Museum of Art.

First version (1891–92)
Diana was commissioned by architect Stanford White as a weather vane for the tower of Madison Square Garden, a theater-and-dining complex at 26th Street and Madison Avenue in Manhattan. He talked his friend Saint-Gaudens into creating it at no charge, and picked up the cost of materials. Model Julia "Dudie" Baird posed for the body of the statue. Its face is that of Davida Johnson Clark, Saint-Gaudens's long-time model and mother of his illegitimate son Louis.

Saint-Gaudens's design specified that the figure appear to delicately balance on its left toe atop a ball. However, the Ohio metal shop was unable to pass the rotating rod through the toe, so the design was altered and the figure instead was poised (less-gracefully) on its heel.

Diana was unveiled atop Madison Square Garden's tower on September 29, 1891. The 304-foot (92.66 m) building had been completed a year earlier, and was the second-tallest in New York City. But the addition of the statue made it the city's tallest, by 13 feet (3.96 m). The figure's billowing copper foulard (scarf) was intended to catch the wind, but the statue did not rotate smoothly because of its weight. Dianas nudity offended moral crusader Anthony Comstock and his New York Society for the Suppression of Vice. To placate Comstock and to increase the likelihood of its catching the wind, Saint-Gaudens draped the figure in cloth, but the cloth blew away.
 
Soon after installation, both White and Saint-Gaudens concluded that the figure was too large for the building, and decided to create a smaller, lighter replacement. Following less than a year atop the tower, the statue was removed and shipped to Chicago to be exhibited at the 1893 World's Columbian Exposition. New Yorker W. T. Henderson wrote a tongue-in-cheek poetic tribute – "Diana Off the Tower" – a play on both the statue's name and situation.

Saint-Gaudens served as head of the Chicago exposition's sculpture committee. His initial plan had been to place Diana atop the Women's Pavilion, but the city's Women's Christian Temperance Union protested and insisted that the controversial nude figure be clothed. Instead, it was placed atop the Agricultural Building.

The original Diana does not survive. In June 1894, eight months after the exposition's closing, a major fire tore through its buildings. The lower half of the statue was destroyed; the upper half survived the fire, but was later lost or discarded.

Second version (1893–present)

Diana was completely redesigned by Saint-Gaudens – with a more elegant pose, a different thrust to the body, a thinner figure, smaller breasts and a more graceful angle to the leg.  To better fit the proportions of Madison Square Garden's tower, the statue's height was scaled down to 14.5 feet (4.4 m). The second version was made of hollowed copper, and weighed 700 lb (318 kg) – more than 60% less than the first version – light enough to rotate with the wind. As Saint-Gaudens originally envisioned, the figure was balanced on its left toe atop a ball. The statue was hoisted to the top of the tower on November 18, 1893.

During the day, the gilded figure caught the sun and could be seen from all over the city and as far away as New Jersey.  Electric lights, then a novelty, illuminated it at night; it was the first statue in history to be lit by electricity.

Madison Square Garden was slated to be demolished in 1925 to make way for construction of the New York Life Building. Prior to the building's demolition, Diana was removed and put in storage. The intention was for the statue to remain in New York City, however a seven year search to find a place to display it proved futile.  In 1932, the New York Life Insurance Company presented Diana to the Philadelphia Museum of Art as a gift. It remains displayed on the balcony of the museum's Great Stair Hall.

Restoration

When Diana was removed from Madison Square Garden in 1925, much of its gilded exterior was gone, having eroded away over three decades of exposure to the elements. The Philadelphia Museum of Art cleaned and repaired the statue in 1932, but the gold leaf was not replaced.

In 2013, scaffolding was constructed around the statue in the museum's Great Stair Hall for a year-long restoration.  Conservators carefully cleaned its copper surface with chemicals and steam, removing nearly a century of dirt and grime.  Samples of the small patches of remaining gold leaf on the statue were taken in an effort to match the carat, weight and color with its replacement.  The statue's surface was then repaired and regilded with 180 square feet of gold leaf.  Because it was known from contemporary sources that Saint-Gaudens did not like the look of bright gold at eye level, the conservators matted the gilding to reduce the glare and museum lighting designers adjusted the display lights for the interior display.

On July 14, 2014, the restored statue was unveiled and rededicated.

Cultural references

In the popular 1975 novel Ragtime, author E.L. Doctorow suggests in a single line that showgirl Evelyn Nesbitt had posed for the second version of the Diana statue.  Having grown up poor in the streets of a Pennsylvania coal town, Nesbitt had risen up to become “the Gaudens statue Stanny White had put at the top of the tower of Madison Square Garden, a glorious bronze nude Diana, her bow drawn, her face in the skies.”

The 1981 film version of Ragtime expanded upon this incident as the cause of a major conflict between Stanford White and Nesbitt's millionaire husband Harry K. Thaw.  In the film, Thaw demands that the statue be taken down from the top of the Garden as it is an embarrassment to him.  The character is seen glaring angrily at the statue before shooting White to death at the Rooftop Theatre at Madison Square Garden on June 25, 1906.

Both situations are completely fictional.  The second version of Diana was placed atop the tower in 1893, when Nesbitt was only about nine years old, and eight years before she was introduced to White.

Other versions

Half-sized statues

Stanford White was so pleased with the 1893 second version that he asked Saint-Gaudens to create a half-sized copy in cement. This was installed in 1894 in the garden of White's Long Island estate, Box Hill, where it stood for many years. For the half-sized copy, Saint-Gaudens poised the figure on a half-ball. White's cement statue later was used to produce two bronze casts in 1928, and six bronze casts in 1987. The cement statue is now in the collection of the Amon Carter Museum of American Art. 
 Saint-Gaudens National Historic Site, plaster. Saint-Gaudens's 1894 model.
 Amon Carter Museum of American Art, cement. Stanford White's 1894 copy.
 1928 casts
 Metropolitan Museum of Art, gilded bronze
 Bass Hall, Fort Worth, Texas, bronze
 1987 casts
 Madison Square Garden, New York City, bronze 
 Brookgreen Gardens, bronze 
 Princeton University Art Museum, bronze
 Private collection, Saint-James, New York, bronze
 Private collection, Chicago, Illinois, bronze
 Private collection, Santa Fe, New Mexico, bronze

Statuettes

The Smithsonian American Art Museum owns a bronze statuette of Saint-Gaudens's first version of Diana.

Capitalizing on the popularity of the second version, Saint-Gaudens modeled statuettes in two sizes: 31 inches (78 cm), with the figure poised on a half-ball, and 21 inches (53 cm), with the figure poised on a full ball. These were cast in bronze beginning in 1899, and vary in the configuration of bow, arrow, string, hair, patination, and base.
 National Gallery of Art, bronze 
 Metropolitan Museum of Art, bronze
 Indianapolis Museum of Art, bronze
 Cleveland Museum of Art, bronze
 Williams College Museum of Art, bronze
 Saint-Gaudens National Historic Site, bronze
 New York Historical Society, bronze
 Brooklyn Museum, bronze
 Virginia Museum of Fine Arts, bronze
 other museum and private collections.

Busts and heads
In 1908, the sculptor's widow authorized a posthumous casting of nine busts based on Saint-Gaudens's 31-inch (78 cm) statuette. A 7-3/8 in (18.7 cm) plaster bust is at Saint-Gaudens National Historic Site.  Bronze busts are at the Carnegie Museum of Art, and in private collections.

Bronze casts of Diana 's head are at Saint-Gaudens National Historic Site; Harvard University; and elsewhere.

In Seville 

Diana was on the top of a tower which was a replica of the Giralda of Seville. In commemoration, a replica of the Diana was made by the sculptor Ricardo Suárez and stood on the Dock of New York of the city of Seville on October 12 of 2019.

References

External links

PBS Documentary – Augustus Saint-Gaudens: Master of American Sculpture – The Diana 
Jennifer Hardin, "Augustus Saint-Gaudens's Diana of 1891–93: Critical and Public Response to a Singular American Nude", Hood Museum
Augustus Saint-Gaudens, Master Sculptor, exhibition catalog fully online as PDF from The Metropolitan Museum of Art, which contains material on Diana

Copper sculptures in the United States
1922 sculptures
Sculptures by Augustus Saint-Gaudens
Sculptures in the collection of the Philadelphia Museum of Art
Nude sculptures in the United States
Sculptures of Roman goddesses
Sculptures of Artemis
Hunting in art
Finial figures